Prince - It's Showtime! (simply Prince) is a 2010 Indian Hindi-language science fiction action film directed by Kookie Gulati. Co-produced by Kumar S. Taurani and Ramesh S. Taurani under the banner of Tips Industries, the film stars Vivek Oberoi as the titular amnesiac thief who races against time to find an antique coin and becomes surrounded by several people wanting the coin, including three women claiming to be his only girlfriend. 

The film co-stars Aruna Shields, Nandana Sen, Neeru Bajwa and Sanjay Kapoor. The dialogues were written by Mayur Puri. The songs were composed by Sachin Gupta, with the lyrics penned by Sameer. The background score was composed by Sandeep Shirodkar.

Along with its dubbed versions in Tamil and Telugu, the film was released theatrically on 9 April 2010.

Plot
Prince is a sharp and intelligent burglar, but when he wakes up one morning, he finds that he does not remember anything about his past. He goes to a club and meets a girl who claims to be his girlfriend, Maya. The next day, he meets a second girl who claims to be his girlfriend named Maya. She also claims that they work for the police and are after a man named Sarang. She reveals that they must find a special coin and give it to Sarang, after which the cops will arrest him. This coin has a chip in it that can go into one's mind and change one's thoughts completely.

They find the coin inside Prince's shoe and give it to Sarang. Prince finds out that the second "Maya" is really a woman named Serena who works for Sarang. His servant P.K. works for Sarang along with her. The coin is revealed to be a fake. Just as Prince is trapped, the real Maya, who is, in fact his girlfriend, saves him and tells him the actual story. The chip was put inside Prince so that he could work for Sarang. The two began running away. The chip made Prince's brain like a computer, so that once he woke up from sleep, he would forget everything.

Prince and Maya meet Sarang Chinea, who tells them a side effect: every morning when Prince wakes up, his brain crashes, which results in a lot of pain. He has only six days to live as a result. This particular day was the last day. Prince and Maya find the coin, which can save Prince, and Serena goes after them, leading to a high-profile chase. Prince manages to keep the coin safe but faints. A mysterious car arrives, pulls him in, and flees. Shortly after, Maya gets a phone call, saying she must come to a certain location if she wants Prince alive. The caller is a friend of Prince's named Mike. It is revealed that the first Maya that Prince had met at the club, is actually named Priya. Then Maya calls the police.
 
Priya takes the coin and runs away with it, but Mike tells Maya that he has the real coin; the one Priya fled with is a fake. While they are fixing an unconscious Prince, Priya returns, begging to be saved, but gets shot by Sarang and his gang. Prince awakes from his deep sleep. Sarang and his gang escape, but Prince puts a tracking device on Sarang. They track him down, and Prince and Sarang engage in a brief fight. Prince ultimately gets the coin, and Sarang falls off a waterfall to his death. While Prince and Maya are looking forward to a happily-ever-after, in a twist ending, Serena's eyes open, implying that she is still alive.

Cast
 Vivek Oberoi as Prince
 Isaiah as Sarang Sanghvi 
 Aruna Shields as Maya
 Sanjay Kapoor as CBI Officer Ali Khan 
 Nandana Sen as Serena/Maya
 Neeru Bajwa as Priya/Maya
 Dalip Tahil as Colonel Khanna
 Amit Behl as Tony (Bartender)
 Akhilesh Sharma as IT Engineer
 Manish Anand as Mike 
 Mohit Chauhan as Agent Roy
 Mayur Puri as P.K. (Prince's Servant)
 Rajesh Khattar as Sherry
 Dhiraj Regmi as C.I.D. Officer Kai
 Mantu Kumar as Computer Operator

Box office

India
In its opening weekend, the film netted about INR 110 million (Rs. 110 million). It did well in few places and moderately at places primarily having single screens. Overall, the performance at the single screens (70–75%) was far better than its performance in the multiplexes (50–60%).

Overseas
Overseas, Prince performed badly at countries such as the US, UK and Australia. In comparison to  My Name Is Khan (February 12, 2010), 3 Idiots (December 25, 2009) and Jaane Tu... Ya Jaane Na (July 4, 2008). Prince performed and is likely to gross much money from overseas markets.

Prince opened in the US in 54 screens and fetched US$89,047 in its opening weekend; it debuted at #36 at the US box office making US$6,000,000.

Critical reception
Taran Adarsh of Bollywood Hungama rated it 3 out of 5, saying "Prince has all merits to strike a chord with the youth", praising Vivek Oberoi's 'bravura' performance, the film's 'Hollywood style' look and action sequences, as well as the music. Noyon Jyoti Parasara of AOL India gave 3 out of 5, saying, "once you are willing to let go off your beliefs and logic – like you really can't jump off a cliff on your bike and remain unscratched – you would like the film."

On the other hand, Omar Qureshi of Zoom rated Prince 2.5 out of 5, saying, "The film is over the top and unrealistic." Indiatimes.com rated it 2 out of 5 stars saying, "The film has taken the audience for granted, which shows us gadgets hard to believe and futuristic and that such futuristic shows should be limited to Hollywood.". Subhash K. Jha gave 2 out of 5 stars, and said, "Prince wears its super-cool shirt with the slogan 'Come Watch Me' with a little bit too much aggression. But if you love popcorn crunching adventure stories watch Vivek Oberoi play the hero from the hemisphere of hijinks." He praised Oberoi's acting and the action sequences, saying that "To his credit, Oberoi carries off the ceaseless stint with the stunt with arresting aplomb[...]The expertly-executed stunts frequently see our hero jumping down high-rise buildings in breathtaking leaps of fate, with the camera pulling back in respectful awe."

Soundtrack
The original songs of Prince are composed by Sachin Gupta and background score by Sandeep Shirodkar. The lyrics are written by Sameer. The audio comprises six original songs, one instrumental and nine types of remixes by DJ Suketu featuring Aks. The singles of the soundtrack are "O Mere Khuda," "Tere Liye", and "Kaun Hoon Main".

"Tere Liye" appears in as many as four versions in the soundtrack. The last (the unplugged version) is sung by the composer Gupta.

Ankit Ojha of Planet Bollywood, stated in his music review, that "This album is destined to remain on the charts for a very long time, just like Tips' 3 last musical hits including Race (March 21, 2008), Kismat Konnection (July 18, 2008) and Ajab Prem Ki Ghazab Kahani (November 6, 2009) did." He rated the music 8 stars out of 10.

Track listing

References

External links
 Prince – Official Website
 

2010s Hindi-language films
2010s chase films
2010 science fiction action films
2010 films
Indian science fiction action films
Indian chase films
Films about robbery
Fiction about memory
Films shot in South Africa
Films set in South Africa